This is the discography of British rock band After the Fire.

Albums

Studio albums

Live albums

Compilation albums

Video albums

Singles

References

Discographies of British artists
Rock music group discographies
New wave discographies